"I Wanna Fight Your Father" is a song by Irish comedy duo The Rubberbandits, taken as their second single. It was released on 25 February 2011.

Video
A video for the song was released on 24 February 2011, which was later removed (It was  re-uploaded on November 30, 2011, except the song had slightly altered, they call this the album version). The duo also released a video for the Irish language version of the song, "Ba Mhaith Liom Bruíon le d'Athair", which, as of November 2015, has over a million views. The Irish-language version samples the riff from the Minnie Riperton song "Inside My Love".

Chart positions

References

2011 songs
Songs about fathers
Songs about violence
The Rubberbandits songs